The siege of Paris of 845 was the culmination of a Viking invasion of West Francia. The Viking forces were led by a Norse chieftain named "Reginherus", or Ragnar, who tentatively has been identified with the legendary saga character Ragnar Lodbrok. Reginherus's fleet of 120 Viking ships, carrying thousands of warriors, entered the Seine in March and sailed up the river.

The Frankish king Charles the Bald assembled a smaller army in response but after the Vikings defeated one division, comprising half of the army, the remaining forces retreated. The Vikings reached Paris at the end of the month, during Easter. They plundered and occupied the city, withdrawing after Charles the Bald paid a ransom of 7,000 French livres [] in gold and silver.

Background
The Frankish Empire was first attacked by Viking raiders in 799 (ten years after the earliest-known Viking attack at Portland, Dorset, in England), which led Charlemagne to create a defence system along the northern coast in 810. The defence system repulsed a Viking attack at the mouth of the Seine in 820 (after Charlemagne's death) but failed to hold against renewed attacks of Danish Vikings in Frisia and Dorestad in 834. The attacks in 820 and 834 were unrelated and relatively minor; systematic raiding did not begin until the mid-830s, with the activity alternating between the two sides of the English Channel. Viking raids were often part of struggles among Scandinavian nobility for power and status. Like other nations adjacent to the Franks, the Danes were well informed about the political situation in France; in the 830s and early 840s they took advantage of the Frankish civil wars. Large raids took place in Antwerp and Noirmoutier in 836, in Rouen (on the Seine) in 841 and in Quentovic and Nantes in 842.

Invasion and siege
In March 845, a fleet of 120 Viking ships containing more than 5,000 men entered the Seine under the command of a chieftain named "Reginherus", or Ragnar.  Ragnar has been identified with the legendary saga figure Ragnar Lodbrok .Around 841, Reginherus was awarded land in Turholt, Flanders, by Charles the Bald, but he eventually lost the land as well as the favour of the King. Reginherus's Vikings raided Rouen on their way up the Seine in 845, and in response to the invasion, Charles—who was determined not to let the royal Abbey of Saint-Denis (near Paris) be destroyed—assembled an army which he divided into two parts, one for each side of the river. The Vikings attacked and defeated one of the divisions of the smaller Frankish army, took 111 of their men as prisoners and hanged them on an island on the Seine. This was done to honour the Norse god Odin, as well as to incite terror in the remaining Frankish forces.

The Vikings arrived in Paris on Easter Sunday, 29 March, entered the city and plundered it. During the siege, a plague broke out in their camp. The Norse had been exposed to the Christian religion, and after first praying to the Norse gods, they undertook a fast, acting on the advice of one of their Christian prisoners, and the plague subsided.

Considering the Vikings' earlier loss of land to Charles, the substantial payment may also have been regarded as some form of compensation to the Viking leader and the invasion itself as an act of revenge. This was the first of a total of thirteen payments of so-called danegeld to Viking raiders by the Franks (the term is not expressly known to have been used at this point). While agreeing to withdraw from Paris, the Viking army pillaged several sites along the coast on the return voyage, including the Abbey of Saint Bertin.

Although Charles had been criticised severely for granting the large ransom payment to the Vikings, he had other more critical issues to deal with at the same time, including disputes with his brothers, regional revolts and disgruntled nobles, as well as pressure from abroad. Since he would have trouble trusting his own counts to assemble and lead troops to defeat the large Viking force militarily, paying them off instead would buy Charles time, and possibly peace from further Viking raids—at least in the near future.

Aftermath
The same year, a Viking fleet sacked Hamburg, which had been elevated to an archbishopric by Pope Gregory IV in 831 on the initiative of Louis the Pious to oversee the Saxon territory and to support the introduction of Christianity to Scandinavia. In response, the Frankish king Louis the German sent a diplomatic mission, headed by Count Cobbo (one of two court counts), to the court of Horik, demanding that the Danish king submit to Frankish overlordship and pay reparations for the invasion. Horik eventually agreed to the terms and requested a peace treaty with Louis, while also promising to return the treasure and captives from the raid. Horik most likely wanted to secure the border with Saxony as he faced a conflict with King Olof of Sweden and domestic struggles. By the treaty, Louis demanded Horik's obedience, which was further secured by Horik regularly sending embassies and gifts to Louis and his suspension of support to Viking raiders.

Although many Vikings had died in the plague during the siege of Paris, Ragnar lived to return home to King Horik. According to a story originating from a member of Cobbo's embassy, Ragnar, having attacked the Abbey of Saint-Germain-des-Prés, then in the outskirts of medieval Paris and which Cobbo later visited, attributed the plague to the power of Saint Germain of Paris. While Ragnar showed the gold and silver he had acquired to Horik and boasted about how easy he thought the conquest of Paris had been, he reportedly collapsed crying while relating that the only resistance he had met was from the long deceased saint. As several of Ragnar's men died not long after, the king was so frightened that he ordered the execution of the survivors and the release of his Christian captives. This event, in part, led Horik to receive Archbishop Ansgar, "Apostle of the North", on friendly terms in his own kingdom. Vikings returned again and again in the 860s and secured loot or ransom but, in a turning point for the history of France, the city's walls held against the Vikings' greatest attacking force in the siege of Paris (885–86).

The synod of Paris was forced to convene at Meaux because of the siege, but it relocated to Paris after the siege was lifted.

References

Sources

 
 
 
 
 
 
 
 
 
 

840s conflicts
845
9th century in West Francia
Paris 845
Paris 845
Battles in Île-de-France
Paris
Siege 0845
Ragnar Lodbrok
River and lake piracy
Paris 845
Paris 845
Paris 845
Viking Age in France